The episodes of .hack//Legend of the Twilight Bracelet are based on the manga of the same name written by Tatsuya Hamazaki and illustrated by Rei Izumi. Set in a fictional MMORPG, The World, the story follows Shugo and Rena on their adventures throughout The World. Mysterious invincible monsters and bugged areas appear throughout The World, prompting Aura to give Shugo the Twilight Bracelet, sending him and Rena on a quest to unravel the mystery of the bracelet and Aura.


Episode list

DVD volumes

Japan

North America
On May 25, 2004, Bandai Entertainment also released a limited edition of the first volume, which came with a CD of the original soundtrack and an art box.

Europe

References

Hack Legend of the Twilight
.hack